Kerochariesthes holzschuhi is a species of beetle in the family Cerambycidae. It was described by Pierre Téocchi in 1989. It is known from Saudi Arabia.

References

Tragocephalini
Beetles described in 1989